René Bihel (2 September 1916 – 8 September 1997) was a French professional football player who became a trainer.

Biography 
His first appearance was in 1929 with the US Trèfileries youth team in Le Havre. He played professionally as a centre forward at US Valenciennes-Anzin from 1938 to 1939. In 1944, he moved to Lille OSC. He also played for Olympique de Marseille, SC Toulon and RC Strasbourg.

Nicknamed le taureau normand (the Norman bull) he was selected six times and scored one goal for the France national team between 1945 and 1947. During the period from 1934 to 1951 as a professional club footballer, he played 239 matches and scored a total 177 registered goals.

After his career as a player, he became a trainer at Havre AC (1953), and later at Blois.

Honours 
 Champion of France D1 1946 with Lille and 1948 with Marseille.
 Winner of the Coupe de France 1946 with Lille and 1951 with Strasbourg.
 Finalist Coupe de France 1945 with Lille
 Top goal scorer in the championship of France D1 1945–46 with 28 goals.

External links
Statistics
Statistics
Profile

References 

1916 births
1997 deaths
People from Montivilliers
French people of German descent
French footballers
France international footballers
Valenciennes FC players
Le Havre AC players
Lille OSC players
Olympique de Marseille players
SC Toulon players
RC Strasbourg Alsace players
Ligue 1 players
French football managers
Le Havre AC managers
US Quevilly-Rouen Métropole players
Blois Football 41 players
Association football forwards
Sportspeople from Seine-Maritime
SC Fives players
Footballers from Normandy